Brimpsfield Castle was a castle in the village of 
Brimpsfield in the county of Gloucestershire, England, between Gloucester and Cirencester.It is likely that the first castle was built after the Norman invasion.  Then, in the 12th or 13th century, it was rebuilt in stone.  The owner, John Giffard, 2nd Lord of Brimpsfield, rebelled against King Edward II and was executed in 1322. The castle was then destroyed.

Today the remains consist of a mound with an outer bank and ditch and the foundations of a gatehouse.

See also
 Castles in Great Britain and Ireland
 List of castles in England

References

Fry, Plantagenet Somerset, The David & Charles Book of Castles, David & Charles, 1980.

Further reading

Castles in Gloucestershire